The following list gives number of performances of grand opera at the Paris Opera from premiere to 1962, (as given by Stéphane Wolff, Albert Soubies and other sources).
{| class="sortable"
|-
! Work !! Premiere !! Number of performances !! Last performance
|-
| La muette de Portici, (Auber) || 1828 || 489 || 1882
|-
| Guillaume Tell, (Rossini) || 1829 || 911 || 1930
|-
| Robert le diable (Meyerbeer) || 1831 || 751 || 1892; revived in 1984
|-
| Gustave III (Auber) || 1833 || 168 || 1853
|-
| La Juive (Fromental Halévy) || 1835 || 534 || 1934; revived in 2007
|-
| Les Huguenots (Meyerbeer) || 1836 || 1120 || 1936; revived in 2018
|-
| Stradella (Niedermeyer) || 1837 || || 1840 (in 3-act form)
|-
| Guido et Ginevra (Halévy) || 1838 || || revived in 1840 (in 4-act form); revived again in 1870
|-
| Le lac des fées (Auber) || 1839 || 30 <ref>Charlton, David. The Cambridge Companion to Grand Opera, p. 187, available online at Google Books.</ref>
|-
| La favorite (originally titled L'ange de Nisida) (Donizetti) || 1840 || ||
|-
| Les martyrs (French version of Poliuto) (Donizetti) || 1840 || 20 || 1842
|-
| La reine de Chypre (Halévy) || 1841 || 152 || 1878
|-
| Charles VI (Halévy) || 1843 || 61 || 1850
|-
| Dom Sébastien (Donizetti) || 1843 || 33 || 1849
|-
| Marie Stuart (Niedermeyer) || 1844 || || 1846; revived in 2002
|-
| Jérusalem (Verdi) || 1847 || 20 || 1849
|-
| Le prophète (Meyerbeer) || 1849 || 573 || 1912
|-
| L'enfant prodigue (Auber) || 1850
|-
| Les vêpres siciliennes (Verdi) || 1855 || 81 || 1864
|-
| La reine de Saba (Gounod) || 1862 || 15 || 1862
|-
| L'Africaine (Meyerbeer) || 1865 || 484 || 1902
|-
| Don Carlos (Verdi) || 1867 || 81 || 1864
|-
| Hamlet (Thomas) || 1868 || 384 || 1938
|-
| Le roi de Lahore (Massenet) || 1877 || 57 || 1879
|-
| Polyeucte (Gounod) || 1878 || 29 || 1879
|-
| Henry VIII (Saint-Saëns) || 1883 || 87 || 1919
|-
| Le Cid (Massenet) || 1885 || 152 || 1919
|-
| Patrie! (Paladilhe) || 1886 || 93 || 1919
|}

References
 Soubies, Albert. Soixante-sept Ans a L'Opéra en une Page, 1826–1893; Paris, 1893;
 Wolff, Stephane. L'Opéra au Palais Garnier 1875–1962''; Paris n.d. but probably 1963

 
French
 
Paris Opera list
performances of French grand operas at the Paris Opéra
performances of French grand operas at the Paris Opéra